Aethes argentilimitana, the silver-bordered aethes, is a species of moth of the family Tortricidae. It is found in North America, where it has been recorded from Ontario, Illinois, Indiana, Kentucky, Maine, Massachusetts, Michigan, Minnesota, Mississippi, New Jersey, Ohio, Pennsylvania, Vermont and Wisconsin. The habitat consists of dry, open areas of meadows and fields.

The length of the forewings is 3.9–5.7 mm. The ground colour of the forewings is white with buff to raw umber markings. The hindwings are drab. Adults are on wing from April to September, probably in multiple generations per year.

References

Moths described in 1869
argentilimitana
Moths of North America